Types of art techniques There is no exact definition of what constitutes art. Artists have explored many styles and have used many different techniques to create art.

Art techniques

A

 Airbrushing technique
 Aerial perspective technique
 Acrylic painting techniques
 Aging (artwork) technique
 Aquatint
 Assemblage (art) technique
 Animation (digital art)
 AI art (digital art)

B
 Basse-taille enameling technique
 Burnishing
 Freehand brush work

C

 Camaïeu technique
 Cast paper
 Ceramic forming techniques
 Cerography
 Champlevé
 Chiaroscuro technique
 Cloisonné
 Collage
 Contour drawing technique
 Contour rivalry
  Crosshatching

D

 Dalle de verre
 Décollage technique
 Digital painting technique
 Distressing technique
 Divisionism technique
 Drip painting 
 Droste effect
 Drybrush
 Dye-sublimation technique

E
 Embossing technique
 Encaustic (hot wax) painting technique
 En résille enameling technique
 Etching technique

F

 Fat over lean 
 Faux painting
 Fingerpaint 
 Fresco 
 Froissage
 Fresco-secco

G

 Gilding technique
 Glassblowing
 Glaze (painting technique) 
 Gongbi 
 Gradation
 Grattage 
 Grisaille

H
 Haboku
 Hierarchical proportion

I

 Illusionistic ceiling painting
 Impasto 
 Intaglio (printmaking) technique
 Ink wash painting technique

J

K
 Keum-boo gilding technique

L
 Linocut technique
 Lithography
 Lost-wax casting

M

 Metalcut technique
 Mosaic art technique
 Multidimensional art
 Mural Painting technique

N
 Nerikomi artistic technique

O
 Oblique projection

P
 
 Paint by number 
 Paper craft
 Pholage artistic technique
 Plique-à-jour enameling technique
 Pointillé technique
 Pointillism
 Pouncing technique

Q

R
 Rapid visualization graphic artist technique
 Relief art technique
 Relief printing technique
 Repoussé and chasing technique
 Resin art technique

S

 Scratchitti graffiti
 Scratchboard
  Screen printing technique
 Screentone texture technique
 Sfumato technique
 Shading
  Sgraffito technique
 Spray painting technique
 stippling
 still life

T
 Tarashikomi 
 Texture (painting)
 Transfer technique (drawing)
 Trompe-l'œil technique

U
 Underpainting

V
 Verdaille (green shades technique)

W

 Watercolor painting
 Welded sculpture technique
 Wet-on-wet
 Wire sculpture
 Wood engraving technique
 Woodblock printing (Moku hanga) technique

X

Y

Z

 ZENTANGLE

See also

 Art movement
 Creativity techniques
 Hockney–Falco thesis
 Kalliroscope
 List of art media
 List of artistic media
 List of art movements
 List of most expensive paintings
 List of most expensive sculptures
 List of sculptors

References

Art
Art methods